Flemingsburg is a home rule-class city in Fleming County, Kentucky, in the United States. The population was 2,658 at the 2010 census, down from 3,010 at the 2000 census. It is the seat of Fleming County.

Geography
Flemingsburg is located northwest of the center of Fleming County at  (38.420541, -83.737581).

Climate
The climate in this area is characterized by hot, humid summers and generally mild to cool winters.  According to the Köppen Climate Classification system, Flemingsburg has a humid subtropical climate, abbreviated "Cfa" on climate maps.

History
Flemingsburg was founded in 1797 by George S. Stockton, a native Virginian, who named the town and county after his half-brother Colonel John Fleming. It has been the seat of Fleming County since its formation and was formally incorporated by the state assembly in 1812.

Demographics

As of the census of 2000, there were 3,010 people, 1,294 households, and 821 families residing in the city. The racial makeup of the city was 92.72% White, 5.05% African American, 0.10% Native American, 0.40% Asian, 0.43% from other races, and 1.30% from two or more races. Hispanic or Latino of any race were 1.03% of the population.

There were 1,294 households, out of which 29.3% had children under the age of 18 living with them, 45.5% were married couples living together, 14.8% had a female householder with no husband present, and 36.5% were non-families. 33.9% of all households were made up of individuals, and 18.2% had someone living alone who was 65 years of age or older. The average household size was 2.25 and the average family size was 2.87.

In the city, the population was spread out, with 23.3% under the age of 18, 7.9% from 18 to 24, 25.2% from 25 to 44, 23.2% from 45 to 64, and 20.5% who were 65 years of age or older. The median age was 41 years. For every 100 females, there were 81.3 males. For every 100 females age 18 and over, there were 74.1 males.

The median income for a household in the city was $23,708, and the median income for a family was $33,365. Males had a median income of $26,550 versus $21,165 for females. The per capita income for the city was $14,914. About 15.0% of families and 19.0% of the population were below the poverty line, including 23.5% of those under age 18 and 26.8% of those age 65 or over.

Education
Flemingsburg has a lending library, the Fleming County Public Library.

Notable people
 James J. Andrews, Civil War spy
 Landaff Andrews, United States Representative
 Herman Chittison, jazz musician
 Leander Cox, congressman
 Willis A. Gorman, Union Army general during the American Civil War, member of U.S. House of Representatives for Indiana, and territorial governor of Minnesota
 Joseph J. Reynolds, Union Army general
 Alvin Saunders, United States senator from Nebraska
 Mary Eulalie Fee Shannon (1824-1855), poet
 Franklin R. Sousley, one of six men who raised the second American flag on Mount Suribachi during the Battle of Iwo Jima
 Nelson Stacy, NASCAR and ARCA driver
 Lawrence S. Trimble, congressman

References

External links
City of Flemingsburg official website

Cities in Kentucky
Cities in Fleming County, Kentucky
County seats in Kentucky
1797 establishments in Kentucky